Gregorio Jose de Omaña y Sotomayor (born 1739 in Santiago Tilapa) was a Mexican clergyman and bishop for the Roman Catholic Archdiocese of Antequera, Oaxaca. He was ordained in 1792. He was appointed bishop in 1793. He died in 1797.

References 

1739 births
1797 deaths
Mexican Roman Catholic bishops
People from the State of Mexico